The 1876 United States presidential election in Florida took place on November 7, 1876, as part of the 1876 United States presidential election. Florida voters chose four representatives, or electors, to the Electoral College, who voted for president and vice president.

Florida was won by Rutherford B. Hayes, the governor of Ohio (R-Ohio), running with Representative William A. Wheeler, with 50.99% of the vote, against Samuel J. Tilden, the former governor of New York (D–New York), running with Thomas A. Hendricks, the governor of Indiana and future vice president, with 49.01% of the popular vote.

Florida, along with South Carolina and Louisiana, was one of the states affected by the Compromise of 1877.

This would be the final time a Republican presidential candidate would carry Florida until 1928.

Results

See also 

 1876 United States House of Representatives elections in Florida
 1876 Florida gubernatorial election

References 

Florida
1876
1876 Florida elections